Al Mamourah is the name of a suburb of the city of Ras Al Khaimah in the United Arab Emirates (UAE).

Populated places in the Emirate of Ras Al Khaimah